State Route 97 (SR 97) is a primary state highway in the U.S. state of Virginia.  Known as Pipers Gap Road, the state highway runs  from SR 89 in Galax east to SR 608 and SR 620 next to the Blue Ridge Parkway.

Route description

SR 97 begins at an intersection with SR 89 (Main Street) in the independent city of Galax.  The state highway heads east and immediately exits the city limits and enters Grayson County.  SR 97 parallels Chestnut Creek until the highway enters Carroll County, then follows Wards Mill Branch to its source near the hamlet of Pipers Gap.  The state highway continues southeast to the hamlet of Drenn adjacent to Pipers Gap, the wind gap of the Blue Ridge Mountains at the Eastern Continental Divide.  There, SR 775 (Chances Creek Road) continues straight while SR 97 turns south to its eastern terminus at the intersection of SR 608 (Mt. Carroll Road) and SR 620 (Lambsburg Road).  SR 620 continues southeast under the Blue Ridge Parkway overpass to descend the eastern side of the Blue Ridge.  SR 608 heads southwest to an intersection with the Blue Ridge Parkway.

Major intersections

References

External links

Virginia Highways Project: VA 97

097
State Route 097
State Route 097
State Route 097